The 2015–16 Ukrainian Basketball SuperLeague was the 2015–16 edition of the Ukrainian basketball championship. The season started on October 10, 2015.

The original top-tier Ukrainian SuperLeague was split in two before the season began, after eight teams from the league created the new Ukrainian SL Favorit Sport.

Teams

Regular season

Playoffs

Ukrainian clubs in European competitions

References

External links
Official Superleague website

Ukrainian Basketball SuperLeague seasons
1
Ukraine